A Woman of No Importance is a 1945 Argentine comedy drama film directed by Luis Bayón Herrera and starring Mecha Ortiz, Santiago Gómez Cou, Golde Flami. The film is based on Oscar Wilde's 1894 play A Woman of No Importance with the action moved from London to Córdoba in central Argentina.

Cast
 Mecha Ortiz as Raquel Miramar  
 Santiago Gómez Cou as Jorge Nájera 
 Golde Flami as Sra. Allamby 
 Hugo Pimentel as Gerardo Miramar  
 Lidia Denis as Esther Jaunarena  
 Blanca Vidal as Juana  
 Lucía Barause as Vecina 
 Sara Barrié as Carolina  
 Yolanda Alessandrini as Sra.Sutfield  
 Yuki Nambá as Vecina 2  
 Lea Briand as Mujer 1 
 Margarita Burke as Mujer 2  
 César Mariño as Juan 
 Carlos Enríquez 
 Carlos A. Gordillo
 Luis Quiles
 Fanny Stein

References

Bibliography 
 Tanitch, Robert. Oscar Wilde on Stage and Screen. Methuen Publishing, 1999.

External links 

1945 films
Argentine comedy-drama films
1945 comedy-drama films
1940s Spanish-language films
Films directed by Luis Bayón Herrera
Films set in Argentina
Argentine films based on plays
Films based on works by Oscar Wilde
Argentine black-and-white films
1940s Argentine films